is a professional Go player.

Biography 
Mizokami Tomochika is part of the older class of players in the 6 - 9 dan range in Japan.

Titles & runners-up

External links
GoBase Profile
Nihon Ki-in Profile (Japanese)

1977 births
Japanese Go players
Living people